Rudolf Koil (1879 – ?) was an Estonian politician. He was a member of Estonian Constituent Assembly. He was a member of the assembly since 17 December 1919. He replaced August Reeben.

References

1879 births
Members of the Estonian Constituent Assembly
Year of death missing